San Simon Cienaga, a cienega, on the San Simon River in Hidalgo County, New Mexico.

References

Landforms of Hidalgo County, New Mexico
Landforms of New Mexico
Wetlands of the United States